The Leavitt Corporation is a manufacturer of nuts and peanut butter, formed by Michael Hintlian in 1925. The company's manufacturing facility is located in Everett, Massachusetts, just north of Boston. Leavitt employs approximately 100 employees. The company is a third generation family-owned and operated company. Current owners consist of a living daughter and grandchildren of founder Michael Hintlian in addition to executive management. Leavitt's CEO currently is Mark Hintlian who succeeded his father James T. Hintlian in 2007. James (Jamie) T. Hintlian, Jr now serves as the company's chairman. Leavitt produces several products under three primary brand names: Teddie Peanut Butter, Americana and River Queen Nuts. Leavitt also produces nut butters and mixed nuts under a variety of private labels. Leavitt prides itself in strict adherence to food safety and quality standards and proudly holds a level III SQF food safety certification. Leavitt products are exported internationally to countries such as Switzerland, Serbia, Croatia, UK, Germany, Japan, Saudi Arabia, Russia, Brazil, Argentina and Panama.

Products

Teddie Peanut Butter
Teddie, the staple brand for the company's peanut butter, is manufactured in a variety of different forms and is the number one selling natural peanut butter in New England. The "All Natural Peanut Butter" comes in multiple-sized jars, available in smooth, super chunky, unsalted, and unsalted super chunky varieties. In addition, there are the "All Natural" and "Homogenized" versions. The All Natural also branch into different variations including organic, flax seed oil, and a combination of the two. The Homogenized peanut butter is an inorganic product.

River Queen Nuts
The River Queen brand features nuts exclusively. They are available in cashews, cashew halves, peanuts, pistachios, almonds, and mixed nut items. They are available in salted, lightly salted, unsalted, and honey roast varieties.

Charitable Causes & Partnerships

Leavitt is a major sponsor of local events and philanthropic causes such as the Greater Boston Food Bank. Teddie is the official peanut butter of Best Buddies International and the Boston Celtics.

References

External links
 Official website

Food manufacturers of the United States
Manufacturing companies based in Massachusetts
American companies established in 1925
Food and drink companies established in 1925
1925 establishments in Massachusetts